A cosmological decade (CÐ) is a division of the lifetime of the cosmos. The divisions are logarithmic in size, with base 10.  Each successive cosmological decade represents a ten-fold increase in the total age of the universe.

As expressed in log (seconds per Ðecade)
When CÐ is measured in log( seconds/Ð ), CÐ 1 begins at 10 seconds and lasts 90 seconds (until 100 seconds after Time Zero).  CÐ 100, the 100th cosmological decade, lasts from 10100 to 10101 seconds after Time Zero.  CÐ  is Time Zero.

The epoch CÐ −43.2683 was 10(−43.2683) seconds, which represents the Planck time since the Big Bang (Time Zero).  There were an infinite number of cosmological decades between the Big Bang and the Planck epoch (or any other point in time).  The current epoch, CÐ 17.6389, is 10(17.6389) seconds, or 13.799(21) billion years, since the Big Bang.  There have been 60.9 cosmological decades between the Planck epoch, CÐ −43.2683, and the current epoch, CÐ 17.6389.

As expressed in log (years per Ðecade)
The cosmological decade can be expressed in log years per decade. In this definition, the 100th cosmological decade lasts from 10100 years to 10101 years after Time Zero.  To convert to this format, simply divide by seconds per year; or in logarithmic terms, subtract 7.4991116 from the values listed above. Thus when CÐ is expressed in log( years/Ð ), the Planck time could also be expressed as 10(−43.2683 − 7.4991116) years = 10(−50.7674) years.

In this definition, the current epoch is CÐ (17.6355 − 7.4991116), or CÐ 10.1364. As before, there have been 60.9 cosmological decades between the Planck epoch and the current epoch.

In their view, the history of the universe can be segmented into five eras:

References

Decade
Units of time